A number of steamships have been named Aenos, including:

Ship names